Jesse Moss is a Canadian television, film and voice actor. He is perhaps best known for his roles in the television series Whistler (2006–2008) as well as the films Final Destination 3 (2006), The Uninvited (2009) and Tucker & Dale vs. Evil (2010). He has won a Leo Award from four nominations.

Life and career
Moss is best known for his roles of Jason Wise in Final Destination 3 and Quinn McKaye on Whistler, for which Moss won a Leo Award for Best Lead Performance by a Male in a Dramatic Series in 2007. Moss also starred in Dear Mr. Gacy, the 2010 film adaptation of The Last Victim, the memoirs of Jason Moss (no relation). The film focuses on Jason (played by Jesse Moss), a college student who corresponded with notorious serial killer John Wayne Gacy (played by William Forsythe).

He has also been involved as a voice actor in animation including Reboot, Billy the Cat, Trollz, Firehouse Tales, Captain Zed and the Zee Zone, Troll Tales, My Little Pony Tales, Pocket Dragon Adventures, Mary-Kate and Ashley in Action! and Mummies Alive!.
	
Moss has one brother, Rory Moss, and one sister, actress Tegan Moss.

Filmography

Film

Television

References

External links

Living people
Canadian male child actors
Canadian male film actors
Canadian male television actors
Canadian male voice actors
21st-century Canadian male actors
20th-century Canadian male actors
Year of birth missing (living people)
Place of birth missing (living people)